El tesoro (English: Digging for Love) is a Colombian telenovela produced and broadcast by Caracol Televisión from April 20 to August 23, 2016.

Cast 
 Julio Pachón as Silvio Murcia
 Alina Lozano as Judith Ruiz de Murcia
 Juan Sebastián Caicedo as Manuel Otero Cubillos
 Carlos Vergara Montiel as Efraín Otero
 Lorna Cepeda as Nazly Cubillos Rebollo de Otero
 Juliette Pardau as Jenny Murcia Ruiz
 Erick Cuéllar as Richard Murcia Ruiz
 Vivian Ossa as Luz del Sol Otero Cubillos
 Ana Wills as Sara Bermejo
 Jacques Toukhmanian as Sebastián Holguin 
 Susana Posada as Doctora Cecilia Zuleta
 Epifanio Arévalo as Dr. Herbert Téllez, «Colombian scientist»
 Jorge Hugo Marin as Alberto Torres
 Alberto Borja as Jacobo Otero
 Ana María Arango as Carola Vda de Suescún
 Alberto Saavedra as Padre Javier
 Bayardo Ardila as Abogado Martinez  
 Paula Estrada as Rocío, «Jenny's friend»
 Matias Maldonado as Felipe Franco
 Juan Sebastian Quintero as Santiago Devia
 Fernando Arango as Vargas, «Guardia de la cárcel»
 Michael Steven Henao as Nicolás Holguin Zuleta
 Ismael Barrios as Padre Gabriel
 Alexandra Restrepo as Rosaura Cubillos Rebollo, «hermana de Nazly»
 Ricardo Riveros as «Canal 5 producer»
 Gustavo Navarro as Anibal Bermejo, «Padre de Sara»
 Ana Soler as María Nela de Dangond
 Mónica Uribe as Maritza Benítez
 Néstor Alfonso Rojas as Arnulfo
 Jose Rojas as Rafael Dangond
 Rodolfo Silva as "Alias El mudo"
 Gabriel Ochoa as Henry
 Kepa Amuchastegui as Dr. Matias Holguin †
 Margalida Castro as Adela Otero
 Álvaro Bayona as Francisco Suescún

References

External links 
  

2016 telenovelas
Colombian telenovelas
Caracol Televisión telenovelas
2016 Colombian television series debuts
2016 Colombian television series endings
Spanish-language telenovelas
Television shows set in Bogotá
Television shows set in Cartagena, Colombia
Television shows set in Spain